Dendron Swamp Natural Area Preserve is a  Natural Area Preserve in Sussex County, Virginia, USA. Located along the Blackwater River, the preserve supports a bald cypress and tupelo swamp. Some of the larger cypresses are believed to be over 600 years old. Within the preserve is a nesting site for the great blue heron.

The preserve contains the Charles C. Steirly Natural Area, a  swamp containing an essentially virgin forest of bald cypress and water tupelo that was designated as a National Natural Landmark in 1974.

The preserve does not have facilities for public access and visitors must make arrangements with the Virginia Department of Conservation and Recreation before visiting.

See also
 List of National Natural Landmarks in Virginia
 List of Virginia Natural Area Preserves

References

External links
Virginia Department of Conservation and Recreation: Dendron Swamp Natural Area Preserve

Virginia Natural Area Preserves
National Natural Landmarks in Virginia
Protected areas of Sussex County, Virginia
Landforms of Sussex County, Virginia
Swamps of Virginia